The People of the State of California v. Orenthal James Simpson was a criminal trial in Los Angeles County Superior Court starting in 1994, in which O. J. Simpson, a former National Football League (NFL) player, broadcaster and actor, was tried and acquitted for the murders of his ex-wife Nicole Brown Simpson and her friend Ronald Goldman. The pair were stabbed to death outside Brown's condominium in the Brentwood neighborhood of Los Angeles on the night of June 12, 1994. The trial spanned eleven months, from November 9, 1994 to October 3, 1995.

Opening statements were made on January 24, 1995. Though prosecutors argued that Simpson was implicated by a significant amount of forensic evidence, Simpson was ultimately acquitted of both counts of murder on October 3 of the same year. The trial took place shortly after the 1992 Los Angeles riots. Commentators agree that the defense capitalized on anger among the city’s African-American community toward the LAPD, which had a history of racial bias, to convince the majority-Black jury to acquit Simpson. The trial is often characterized as the trial of the century because of its international publicity, and has been described as the "most publicized" criminal trial in human history.

Following questioning by police detectives, Simpson was formally charged with the murders on June 17 after investigators found a blood-stained glove on his property. After he did not turn himself in at the agreed time, he became the object of a low-speed pursuit in a white 1993 Ford Bronco SUV owned and driven by his friend Al Cowlings. TV stations interrupted coverage of the 1994 NBA Finals to broadcast live coverage of the pursuit, which was watched by an estimated 95 million people. The pursuit and Simpson's arrest later on the same day were among the most widely publicized events in American history.

Simpson was represented by a high-profile defense team, referred to as the "Dream Team", which was initially led by Robert Shapiro and subsequently directed by Johnnie Cochran. The team also included F. Lee Bailey, Alan Dershowitz, Robert Kardashian, Shawn Holley, Carl E. Douglas, and Gerald Uelmen. Barry Scheck and Peter Neufeld were two additional attorneys who specialized in DNA evidence. While Deputy District Attorneys Marcia Clark, William Hodgman, and Christopher Darden believed they had a strong case against Simpson, Cochran and the defense team persuaded the jury that there was reasonable doubt concerning the DNA evidence in this case. They contended that the blood sample had been mishandled by lab scientists and technicians and that the case against Simpson had been tainted by LAPD misconduct related to racism and incompetence, in particular noting actions and comments of Detective Mark Fuhrman.

The trial was considered historically significant for the wide division in reaction to the verdict by the public. Observers' opinions of the verdict were related to their ethnicity, and the media dubbed this the "racial gap". A poll of Los Angeles County residents showed that most African-Americans thought that the "not guilty" verdict was justified, while the majority of Whites thought it was a racially motivated jury nullification by the mostly African-American jury. More recent polling shows this "gap" has narrowed since the trial. In 2013 more than half of polled black respondents said that they believed Simpson was guilty.

After the trial, Goldman's father filed a civil suit against Simpson. On February 4, 1997, the jury unanimously found Simpson responsible for the deaths of both Goldman and Brown. The Goldman family was awarded compensatory and punitive damages totaling $33.5 million ($ million in  dollars), but have received only a small portion of that figure. In 2000, Simpson left California for Florida, one of the few states where personal assets such as homes and pensions cannot be seized to cover liabilities that were incurred in other states.

Background

Simpson–Brown marriage

Nicole Brown met O.J. Simpson in 1977 when she was 18 and working as a waitress at the Daisy (a Beverly Hills private club). They began dating although Simpson was already married. Simpson filed for divorce from his first wife in March 1979. 

He and Brown married on February 2, 1985. Brown and Simpson had two children together, daughter Sydney (b. 1985) and son Justin (b. 1988). According to Dr. Lenore Walker, the Simpson-Brown marriage was a "textbook example of domestic abuse". Brown signed a prenuptial agreement and was prohibited from working while married. She wrote that she felt conflicted about notifying the police of the abuse because she was financially dependent on Simpson. Brown described an incident in which Simpson broke her arm during a fight; in order to prevent him from being arrested, she had told emergency room staff that she had fallen off her bike. She wrote about him beating her in public, during sex and even in front of family and friends. Of the 62 incidents of abuse, the police were notified eight times and Simpson was arrested once. On February 25, 1992, Brown filed for divorce, citing "irreconcilable differences".

Brown said that Simpson stalked and harassed her after they divorcedan intimidation tactic meant to force the victim to return to the abuser. She documented an incident in which he spied on her having sex with her new boyfriend. Afterwards, Brown said she felt her life was in danger because Simpson had threatened to kill her if he ever found her with another man. She drafted a will. Brown telephoned Sojourn, a women's shelter, on June 8, 1994. She was considering staying at the shelter because she was afraid of what Simpson might do to her, as she was refusing his pleas to reconcile their marriage. She had reported a set of keys missing from her house a few weeks earlier. The keys were later found on Simpson when he was arrested for the murders of Brown and Ron Goldman.

Frogmen
A few months before the murders, Simpson completed a film pilot for Frogmen, an adventure series similar to The A-Team. Simpson played the lead role of "Bullfrog" Burke, who led a group of former U.S. Navy SEALs. He received "a fair amount of" military training  including use of a knife  for Frogmen, and holds a knife to the throat of a woman (playing the role of his daughter) in one scene. A 25-minute tape of the pilot, which did not include the knife scene, was found by investigators and watched on Simpson's television as they searched his house. The defense tried to block its use on these grounds, but Judge Ito allowed the tape to be shown. However, the prosecution never introduced it as evidence during the trial. It was reported that among the skills of the character of "Bullfrog Burke" was night killings and the "silent kill" technique of slashing the throat, and that SEALs regularly wear knit "watch caps" like the one found at the scene.

Murders

On the evening of June 12, 1994, Brown and Simpson both attended their daughter Sydney's dance recital at Paul Revere Middle School. Afterwards, Brown and her family went to eat at Mezzaluna restaurant; they did not invite Simpson to join them. One of the waiters at the restaurant was Ron Goldman, who had become close friends with Brown in recent weeks, but was not assigned to the Brown family's table. Brown and her children then went to Ben & Jerry's before returning to Brown's condominium in Bundy Drive, Brentwood. The manager of Mezzaluna recounted that Brown's mother telephoned the restaurant at 9:37 pm about a pair of lost eyeglasses. The manager found the glasses and put them in a white envelope, which Goldman took with him as he left the restaurant at the end of his shift at 9:50 pm, intending to drop it off at Brown's place. Meanwhile, Simpson ate takeout food from McDonald's with Kato Kaelin, a bit-part actor and family friend who had been given the use of a guest house on Simpson's estate. Rumors circulated that Simpson had been on drugs at the time of the murder, and the New York Post'''s Cindy Adams reported that the pair had actually gone to a local Burger King, where a prominent drug dealer known only as "J. R." had admitted to selling them crystal meth.

Brown's neighbors testified that they heard  profuse barking coming from outside throughout the night, beginning around 10:15 pm. Around 10:55 pm., a dogwalker who lived a few blocks away from Brown came across Brown's Akita dog barking in the street outside her home. The Akita, whose legs were covered in blood, followed the man home; he tried to walk the dog back to where he found it, but the dog resisted. Later on, he left the Akita with a neighboring couple who offered to keep the dog overnight; as the dog was agitated, the couple decided to walk it back to where it had been found. Around midnight, as they reached the area where the Akita had been found, the dog stopped outside Brown's home and the couple saw Brown's body lying outside the house. Police were called to the scene and found Goldman's body near Brown's.

The front door to Brown's condominium was open when the bodies were found, but there were no signs that anyone had entered the building, by breaking in or otherwise. Brown's body was lying face down and barefoot at the bottom of the stairs leading to the door. The walkway leading to the stairs was covered in blood, but the soles of Brown's feet were clean; based on this evidence, investigators concluded that she was the first person to be killed and the intended target. She had been stabbed multiple times in the head and neck, but there were few defensive wounds on her hands, implying a short struggle to investigators. The final wound inflicted ran deep into her neck, severing her carotid artery. A large bruise in the center of her upper back with a corresponding foot print on her clothing indicated to investigators that, after killing Goldman, the assailant returned to Brown's body, stood on her back, pulled her head back by the hair and slit her throat. Her larynx could be seen through the gaping wound in her neck, and vertebra C3 was incised; Brown's head barely remained attached to her body.

Goldman's body lay nearby, close to a tree and the fence. He had been stabbed multiple times in the body and neck, but there were relatively few defensive wounds on his hands, signifying a short struggle to investigators. Forensic evidence from the Los Angeles County coroner alleged that the assailant stabbed Goldman with one hand while holding him in a chokehold. Near Goldman's body were a blue knit cap; a left-hand, extra-large Aris Isotoner light leather glove; and the envelope containing the glasses that he was returning. Detectives determined that Goldman came to Nicole's house during her killing and that the killer killed him to silence Goldman and remove any witnesses. A trail of the assailant's bloody shoe prints ran through the back gate. To the left of some of the prints were drops of blood from the assailant, who was apparently bleeding from the left hand. Measuring the distance between the prints indicated that the assailant walkedrather than ranaway from the scene.

Flight to Chicago
On the night of June 12, Simpson was scheduled to board a red-eye flight from Los Angeles International Airport to Chicago, where he was due to play golf the following day at a convention with representatives of Hertz rental car Corporation, for whom he was a spokesman. The flight was due to leave at 11:45 pm, and a limousine arrived early at Simpson's Rockingham estate to pick him up at around 10:25 pm. The limousine driver drove around the estate to make sure he could navigate the area with the stretch limousine properly and to see which driveway would have the best access for the limousine. He began to buzz the intercom at 10:40, getting no response. He noted the house was dark and nobody appeared to be home as he smoked a cigarette and made several calls to his boss to get Simpson's home phone number. He testified that at one point he saw a figure the same size as Simpson enter the house through the front door from where the driveway starts, before the lights came on. He did not see what direction the figure came from. He testified that he saw Simpson's house number on the curb outside the estate, but no car was parked outside. The prosecution presented exhibits showing the position next to the house number on the curb in which Simpson's Ford Bronco was found the next morning, implying that the limousine driver would surely have noticed the Bronco if it had been there when he arrived to pick Simpson up.

Around the time the limousine driver witnessed this "shadowy figure" head towards the south walkway where the bloody glove would later be found, Kato Kaelin was having a telephone conversation with a friend. At approximately 10:40, something crashed into the wall of the guest house Kaelin was staying in, which he described as three "thumps" and which he feared was an earthquake. Kaelin hung up the phone and ventured outside to investigate the noises, but did not go directly down the dark south pathway from which the thumps had originated. Instead, he walked to the front of the property, where he saw the limousine parked outside. Kaelin let the limousine in, and Simpson finally came out through the front door a few minutes later, claiming he had overslept. Both the limousine driver and Kaelin would later testify that Simpson seemed agitated that night.

The limousine driver noted that on the way to the airport, Simpson complained about how hot it was, and was sweating and rolled down the window, despite it not being a warm night. The driver also testified that he loaded four luggage bags into the car that night, one of them being a knapsack that Simpson would not let him touch, insisting he load it himself. A porter at the airport testified that Simpson checked only three bags that night, and the police determined that the missing luggage was the same knapsack the limousine driver had mentioned earlier. Another witness not heard at the trial claimed he saw Simpson at the airport discarding items from a bag into a trash can. Detectives Tom Lange and Philip Vannatter believe this is how the murder weapon, shoes and clothes that Simpson wore during the murder were disposed.

Simpson was running late but caught his flight. A passenger on the plane and the pilot testified to not noticing any cuts or wounds on Simpson's hands. A broken glass, a note with a telephone number on it, and bedsheets with blood on them were all recovered from Simpson's room at the O'Hare Plaza Hotel. The manager of the hotel recalled Simpson asking for a Band-Aid for his finger at the front desk, because he had "cut it on pieces of note paper".

Arrest

After learning that Brown was the female victim, LAPD commander Keith Bushey ordered detectives Tom Lange, Philip Vannatter, Ron Phillips, and Mark Fuhrman to notify Simpson of her death and to escort him to the police station to pick up the former couple's children, who were asleep in Brown's condominium at the time of the murders. The detectives buzzed the intercom at Simpson's estate for over 30 minutes but received no response. They noted that Simpson's car was parked at an awkward angle, with its back end out more than the front, and that there was blood on the door, which they feared meant someone inside might be hurt. Vannatter instructed Fuhrman to scale the wall and unlock the gate to allow the other three detectives to enter. The detectives would argue they entered without a search warrant because of exigent circumstances – specifically out of fear that someone inside might be injured. Fuhrman briefly interviewed Kaelin, who told the detective that the car belonged to Simpson and that earlier that night he had heard thumps on his wall. In a walk around the premises to inspect what may have caused the thumps, Fuhrman discovered a blood-stained right-hand glove, which was determined to be the mate of the left-hand glove found next to the body of Goldman. This evidence was determined to be probable cause to issue an arrest warrant for Simpson.

Phillips testified that when he called Simpson in Chicago to tell him of Brown's murder, Simpson sounded "very upset" but was oddly unconcerned about the circumstances of her death. Phillips noted that Simpson only asked if the children had seen the murder or Brown's body, but was not concerned about whether the assailant(s) had harmed the children either. The police contacted Simpson at his home on June 13 and took him to Parker Center for questioning. Lange noticed that Simpson had a cut on a finger on his left hand that was consistent with where the killer was bleeding from, and asked Simpson how he got the cut. At first, Simpson claimed he cut his finger accidentally while in Chicago after learning of Brown's death. Lange then informed Simpson that blood was found inside his car; at this point, Simpson admitted that he had cut his finger on June 12, but said he did not remember how. He voluntarily gave some of his own blood for comparison with evidence collected at the crime scene and was released."O.J.: Made in America", Episode 3 On June 14, Simpson hired lawyer Robert Shapiro, who began assembling Simpson's team of lawyers (referred to as the "Dream Team"). Shapiro noted that an increasingly distraught Simpson had begun treatment for depression. The following days, preliminary results from DNA testing came back with matches to Simpson but the District Attorney delayed filing charges until all the results had come back. Simpson spent the night between June 16 and 17 at the San Fernando Valley home of friend Robert Kardashian; Shapiro asked several doctors to attend to Simpson's purported fragile mental state.

On June 17, detectives recommended that Simpson be charged with two counts of first-degree murder with special circumstance of multiple killings after the final DNA results came back. The LAPD notified Shapiro at 8:30 am that Simpson would have to turn himself in that day. At 9:30 am, Shapiro went to Kardashian's home to tell Simpson that he would have to turn himself in by 11 am, an hour after the murder charges were filed. Simpson told Shapiro that he wanted to turn himself in, to which the police agreed, believing that someone as famous as Simpson would not attempt to flee. The police agreed to delay Simpson's surrender until noon to allow him to be seen by a mental health specialist, as he was showing signs of suicidal depressionhe had updated his will, called his mother and children, and written three sealed letters: one to his children, one to his mother, and one to the public. More than 1,000 reporters waited for Simpson's perp walk at the police station, but he did not arrive as stipulated. The LAPD then notified Shapiro that Simpson would be arrested at Kardashian's home. Kardashian and Shapiro told Simpson this but when the police arrived an hour later, Simpson and Al Cowlings had disappeared. The three sealed letters Simpson had written were left behind. At 1:50 pm, Commander Dave Gascon, LAPD's chief spokesman, publicly declared Simpson a fugitive; the police issued an all-points bulletin for him and an arrest warrant for Cowlings.

"Suicide-note"
At 5 pm, Kardashian and one of his defense lawyers read Simpson's public letter. In the letter, Simpson sent greetings to 24 friends and wrote, "First everyone understand I had nothing to do with Nicole's murder". He described the fights with Brown and their decision not to reconcile their relationship, and asked the media "as a last wish" not to bother his children. He wrote to his then-girlfriend Paula Barbieri, "I'm sorry... we're not going to have, our chance... As I leave, you'll be in my thoughts". It also included "I can't go on" and an apology to the Goldman family. The letter concluded, "Don't feel sorry for me. I have had a great life, great friends. Please think of the real O. J. and not this lost person". Most interpreted this as a suicide note; Simpson's mother collapsed after hearing it, and reporters joined the search for Simpson. At Kardashian's press conference, Shapiro said that he and Simpson's psychiatrists agreed with the suicide note interpretation. Through television, Shapiro appealed to Simpson to surrender.

Bronco chase

News helicopters searched the Los Angeles highway system for Cowlings's white Ford Bronco. At 5:51 pm, Simpson reportedly called 9-1-1; the call was traced to the Santa Ana Freeway, near Lake Forest. At around 6:20 pm, a motorist in Orange County notified California Highway Patrol after seeing someone believed to be Simpson riding in a Bronco on the I-5 freeway heading north. The police tracked calls placed by Simpson on his cell phone. At 6:45 pm, police officer Ruth Dixon saw the Bronco heading north on Interstate 405; when she caught up to it, Cowlings yelled out that Simpson was in the back seat of the vehicle and was pointing a gun at his own head. Zoey Tur of KCBS-TV was the first to find Simpson from a news helicopter, after colleagues heard that the FBI's mobile phone tracking had located Simpson at the El Toro Y. More than nine news helicopters eventually joined the pursuit; Tur compared the fleet to Apocalypse Now, and the high degree of media participation caused camera signals to appear on incorrect television channels. The chase was so long that one helicopter ran out of fuel, forcing its station to ask another for a camera feed.

Knowing that Cowlings was listening to KNX-AM, sports announcer Pete Arbogast called Simpson's former USC football coach John McKay and connected him to Simpson. As both men wept, Simpson told McKay, "OK, Coach, I won’t do anything stupid. I promise" off the air. "There is no doubt in my mind that McKay stopped O.J. from killing himself in the back of that Bronco", Arbogast said. McKay reiterated on radio his pleas to Simpson to turn himself in instead of committing suicide: "My God, we love you, Juice. Just pull over and I'll come out and stand by you all the rest of my life". Walter Payton, Vince Evans, and others from around the country also pleaded with Simpson over radio to surrender. At Parker Center, officials discussed how to persuade Simpson to surrender peacefully. Lange, who had interviewed Simpson about the murders on June 13, realized that he had Simpson's cell phone number and called him repeatedly. A colleague hooked a tape recorder up to Lange's phone and captured a conversation between Lange and Simpson in which Lange repeatedly pleaded with Simpson to "throw the gun out [of] the window" for the sake of his mother and children. Simpson apologized for not turning himself in earlier that day and responded that he was "the only one who deserved to get hurt" and was "just gonna go with Nicole". Simpson asked Lange to "just let me get to the house" and said "I need [the gun] for me". Cowlings's voice is overheard in the recording (after the Bronco had arrived at Simpson's home surrounded by police) pleading with Simpson to surrender and end the chase peacefully.

Los Angeles streets emptied and drink orders stopped at bars as people watched on television. Every television network showed the chase; ABC, NBC, CBS, CNN, and local news outlets interrupted regularly scheduled programming to cover the incident, watched by an estimated 95 million viewers nationwide; only 90 million had watched that year's Super Bowl. While NBC continued coverage of Game 5 of the NBA Finals between the New York Knicks and the Houston Rockets at Madison Square Garden, the game appeared in a small box in the corner while Tom Brokaw covered the chase. The chase was covered live by ABC anchors Peter Jennings and Barbara Walters on behalf of the network's five news magazines, which achieved some of their highest-ever ratings that week. The chase was also broadcast internationally, with Gascon's relatives in France and China seeing him on television. Thousands of spectators and onlookers packed overpasses along the route of the chase, waiting for the white Bronco. In a festival-like atmosphere, many had signs urging Simpson to flee. Spectators shouting "Go, O.J., go"the famous slogan from Simpson's Hertz commercialsand encouraging the actions of a possibly suicidal murder suspect outraged Jim Hill, among those broadcasting pleas to their friend to surrender. Jack Ferreira and Mike Smith were among those watching the chase not knowing why; they felt part of a "common emotional experience", one author wrote, as they "wonder[ed] if O.J. Simpson would commit suicide, escape, be arrested, or engage in some kind of violent confrontation. Whatever might ensue, the shared adventure gave millions of viewers a vested interest, a sense of participation, a feeling of being on the inside of a national drama in the making".

Simpson reportedly demanded that he be allowed to speak to his mother before he would surrender. The chase ended at 8:00 pm at his Brentwood estate,  further, where his son, Jason, ran out of the house, "gesturing wildly", and 27 SWAT officers awaited. After remaining in the Bronco for about 45 minutes, Simpson exited at 8:50 pm with a framed family photo and went inside for about an hour; a police spokesman stated that he spoke to his mother and drank a glass of orange juice, causing reporters to laugh. Shapiro arrived, and Simpson surrendered to authorities a few minutes later. In the Bronco, police found "$8,000 in cash, a change of clothing, a loaded .357 Magnum, a United States passport, family pictures, and a disguise kit with a fake goatee and mustache". Simpson was booked at Parker Center and taken to Men's Central Jail; Cowlings was booked on suspicion of harboring a fugitive and held on $250,000 bail.

The Bronco chase, the suicide note, and the items found in the Bronco were not presented as evidence in the criminal trial. Marcia Clark conceded that such evidence did imply guilt yet defended her decision, citing the public reaction to the chase and suicide note as proof the trial had been compromised by Simpson's celebrity status. Most of the public, including Simpson's friend Al Michaels, interpreted his actions as an admission of guilt yet thousands of people encouraged him to flee prosecution and were sympathetic to his feelings of guilt.

Preliminary hearing
On June 20, Simpson was arraigned and pleaded not guilty to both murders and was held without bail. The following day, a grand jury was called to determine whether to indict him for the two murders but was dismissed on June 23, as a result of excessive media coverage that could have influenced its neutrality. Instead, authorities held a probable cause hearing to determine whether to bring Simpson to trial. California Superior Court Judge Kathleen Kennedy-Powell ruled on July 7that there was sufficient evidence to bring Simpson to trial for the murders. At his second arraignment on July 22, when asked how he pleaded to the murders, Simpson firmly stated: "Absolutely, one hundred percent, not guilty."

Jill Shively testified to the grand jury that soon after the time of the murders she saw a white Ford Bronco speeding away from Bundy Drive in such a hurry that it almost collided with a Nissan at the intersection of Bundy and San Vicente Boulevard, and that she recognized Simpson's voice. She talked to the television show Hard Copy for $5,000, after which prosecutors declined to use her testimony at trial.

Jose Camacho of Ross Cutlery provided store receipts showing Simpson had purchased a 12-inch (305 mm) stiletto knife six weeks before the murders. The knife was recovered and determined to be similar to the one the coroner said caused the stab wounds. The prosecution did not present this evidence at trial after Camacho sold his story to the National Enquirer for $12,500. Tests on the knife determined that an oil used on new cutlery was still present on the knife, indicating it had never been used.

Former NFL player and pastor Rosey Grier visited Simpson on November 13 at the Los Angeles County Jail in the days following the murders. A jailhouse guard, Jeff Stuart, testified to Judge Ito that at one point Simpson yelled to Grier that he "didn't mean to do it", after which Grier had urged Simpson to come clean. Ito ruled that the evidence was inadmissible as being protected because of clergy-penitent privilege.

At first, Simpson's defense sought to show that one or more hitmen hired by drug dealers had murdered Brown and Goldman – giving Brown a "Colombian necktie" – because they were looking for Brown's friend, Faye Resnick, a known cocaine user who had failed to pay for her drugs. She had stayed for several days at Brown's condo until entering rehab four days before the killings. Ito ruled that the drug killer theory was "highly speculative" with no evidence to support it. Consequently, Ito barred the jury from hearing it and prohibited Christian Reichardt from testifying about his former girlfriend Resnick's drug problems.

Rosa Lopez, a neighbor's Spanish-speaking housekeeper, stated on August 18 that she saw Simpson's Bronco parked outside his house at the time of the murders, supporting his claim he was home that night. During cross-examination by Clark, Lopez admitted she was not sure what time she saw Simpson's Bronco but the defense still intended to call her. However, a taped July 29 statement by Lopez did not mention seeing the Bronco but did mention another housekeeper was also there that night, Sylvia Guerra. Prosecutors then spoke with Guerra, who said Lopez was lying and claimed the defense offered both housekeepers $5,000 to say they saw the Bronco that night. When Ito warned the defense that Guerra's claim as well as the earlier statement not mentioning the Bronco and the tape where Clark claims "that [Lopez] is clearly being coached on what to say" will be shown to the jury if Lopez testifies, they dropped her from the witness list.

Media coverage

The murders and trial – "the biggest story I have ever seen", said a producer of NBC's Today – received extensive media coverage from the very beginning; at least one instant book was proposed two hours after the bodies were found, and scheduled to publish only a few weeks later. The case was a seminal event in the history of reality television. The Los Angeles Times covered the case on its front page for more than 300 days after the murders. The nightly news broadcasts from the Big Three television networks gave more air time to the case than to the Bosnian War and the Oklahoma City bombing combined. The media outlets served an enthusiastic audience; one company put the loss of national productivity from employees following the case instead of working at $40 billion. The Tonight Show with Jay Leno aired many skits on the trial, and the Dancing Itos – a troupe of dancers dressed as the judge – was a popular recurring segment. According to Howard Kurtz of the Washington Post, the acquittal was "the most dramatic courtroom verdict in the history of Western civilization".

Participants in the case received much media coverage. Limo driver Park said the media offered him $100,000 but refused, as he would be removed as a witness. Fans approached Clark at restaurants and malls, and when she got a new hairstyle during the trial, the prosecutor received a standing ovation on the courthouse steps; People approved of the change, but advised her to wear "more fitted suits and tailored skirts". While Cochran, Bailey and Dershowitz were already well-known, others like Kaelin became celebrities, and Resnick and Simpson's girlfriend Paula Barbieri appeared in Playboy. Those involved in the trial followed their own media coverage; when Larry King appeared in the courtroom after a meeting with Ito, both Simpson and Clark praised King's talk show. Interest in the case was worldwide; Russian president Boris Yeltsin's first question to President Clinton when they met in 1995 was, "Do you think O.J. did it?"

The issue of whether to allow any video cameras into the courtroom was among the first issues Judge Ito had to decide, ultimately ruling that live camera coverage was warranted. Ito was later criticized for this decision by other legal professionals. Dershowitz said that he believed that Ito, along with others related to the case such as Clark, Fuhrman and Kaelin, was influenced to some degree by the media presence and related publicity. The trial was covered in 2,237 news segments from 1994 through 1997. Ito was also criticized for allowing the trial to become a media circus and not doing enough to regulate the court proceedings.

Among the reporters who covered the trial daily from the courtroom, and a media-area that was dubbed "Camp O. J.", were Steve Futterman of CBS News, Linda Deutsch and Michael Fleeman of the Associated Press, Dan Whitcomb of Reuters, Janet Gilmore of the Los Angeles Daily News, Andrea Ford of the Los Angeles Times, Michelle Caruso of the New York Daily News, Dan Abrams of Court TV, Harvey Levin of KCBS, and David Margolick of The New York Times. Writers Dominick Dunne, Joe McGinniss and Joseph Bosco also had full-time seats in the courtroom.

On June 27, 1994, Time published a cover story, "An American Tragedy", with a photo of Simpson on the cover. The image was darker than a typical magazine image, and the Time photo was darker than the original, as shown on a Newsweek cover released at the same time. Time became the subject of a media scandal. Commentators found that its staff had used photo manipulation to darken the photo, and speculated it was to make Simpson appear more menacing. After the publication of the photo drew widespread criticism of racist editorializing and yellow journalism, Time publicly apologized.

Charles Ogletree, a former criminal defense attorney and current professor at Harvard Law School, said in a 2005 interview for PBS' Frontline that the best investigative reporting around the events and facts of the murder, and the evidence of the trial, was by the National Enquirer.Trial

Simpson wanted a speedy trial, and the defense and prosecuting attorneys worked around the clock for several months to prepare their cases. The trial began on January 24, 1995, seven months after the murders, and was televised by closed-circuit TV camera via Court TV, and in part by other cable and network news outlets, for 134 days. Judge Lance Ito presided over the trial in the C.S. Foltz Criminal Courts Building.

Jury
District Attorney Gil Garcetti elected to file charges in downtown Los Angeles, as opposed to Santa Monica, in which jurisdiction the crimes took place. The Los Angeles Superior Court then decided to hold the trial in Downtown Los Angeles instead of Santa Monica due to safety issues at the Santa Monica Court house owing to the 1994 Northridge earthquake. The decision may have affected the trial's outcome because it resulted in a jury pool that was less educated, had lower incomes, and contained more African Americans. Richard Gabriel, a jury consultant for Simpson, wrote that more educated jurors with higher incomes were more likely to accept the validity of DNA evidence and the argument that domestic violence is a prelude to murder. Gabriel noted that African Americans were far more likely than other minorities to be receptive to claims of racially motivated fraud by the police.
 In October 1994, Judge Lance Ito started interviewing 304 prospective jurors, each of whom had to fill out a 75-page questionnaire. On November 3, twelve jurors were seated with twelve alternates. Over the course of the trial, ten were dismissed for a wide variety of reasons. Only four of the original jurors remained on the final panel.

According to media reports, Clark believed women, regardless of race, would sympathize with the domestic violence aspect of the case and connect with Brown personally. On the other hand, the defense's research suggested that black women would not be sympathetic to Brown, who was white, because of tensions about interracial marriages. Both sides accepted a disproportionate number of female jurors. From an original jury pool of 40 percent white, 28 percent black, 17 percent Hispanic, and 15 percent Asian, the final jury for the trial had ten women and two men, of whom nine were black, two white, and one Hispanic.

On April 5, 1995, juror Jeanette Harris was dismissed when Judge Ito learned she had failed to disclose an incident of domestic abuse. Afterwards, Harris gave an interview and accused the deputies of racism and claimed the jurors were dividing themselves along racial lines. Ito then met with the jurors, who all denied Harris's allegations of racial tension among themselves. The following day, Ito dismissed the three deputies anyway, which upset the jurors that did not complain because the dismissal appeared to lend credence to Harris's allegations, which they all denied. On April 21, thirteen of the eighteen jurors refused to come to court until they spoke with Ito about it. Ito then ordered them to court and the 13 protesters responded by wearing all black and refusing to come out to the jury box upon arrival. The media described this incident as a "Jury Revolt" and the protesters wearing all black as resembling a "funeral procession".

Prosecution case
The two lead prosecutors were Deputy District Attorneys Marcia Clark and Christopher Darden. Clark was designated as the lead prosecutor and Darden became Clark's co-counsel. Prosecutors Hank Goldberg and William Hodgman, who had successfully prosecuted high-profile cases in the past, assisted Clark and Darden. Two prosecutors who were DNA experts, Rockne Harmon and George "Woody" Clarke, were brought in to present the DNA evidence in the case and were assisted by Prosecutor Lisa Kahn.

Theory
The prosecution argued that the domestic violence within the Simpson-Brown marriage culminated in her murder. Simpson's history of abusing Brown resulted in their divorce and him pleading guilty to one count of domestic violence in 1989. On the night of the murders, Simpson attended a dance recital for his daughter and was reportedly angry with Brown because of a black dress that she wore, which he said was "tight". Simpson's then girlfriend, Paula Barbieri, wanted to attend the recital with Simpson but he did not invite her. After the recital, Simpson returned home to a voicemail from Barbieri ending their relationship.

According to the prosecution, Simpson then drove over to Brown's home in his Ford Bronco to reconcile their relationship as a result and when Brown refused, Simpson killed her in a "final act of control". Goldman then came upon the scene to return some eyeglasses and was murdered as well in order to silence him and remove any witnesses. Afterwards, the prosecution said that Simpson walked to his Bronco and drove home, where he parked it and walked into his house. There, he took off his blood stained clothes, put them in the knapsack (except his socks and the glove), put clean ones on, and left towards the limousine. At the Airport, prosecution said that Simpson opened the knapsack, removed the clothes, Bruno Magli shoes, and the murder weapon, and threw them in the trash before putting the knapsack in one of his suitcases and headed towards his flight.

Domestic violence
The prosecution opened its case by calling LAPD 911 dispatcher Sharon Gilbert and playing a four-minute 9-1-1 call from Brown on January 1, 1989, in which she expressed fear that Simpson would physically harm her and Simpson himself is even heard in the background yelling at her and possibly hitting her as well. The officer who responded to that call, Detective John Edwards, testified next that when he arrived, a severely beaten Brown ran from the bushes where she was hiding and to the detective screaming "He's going to kill me, he's going to kill me", referring to Simpson. Pictures of Brown's face from that night were then shown to the jury to confirm his testimony. That incident led to Simpson's arrest and eventual pleading of no contest to one count of domestic violence for which he received probation for one year. LAPD officer and long time friend of both Simpson and Brown, Ron Shipp, testified on February 1, 1995, that Simpson told him the day after the murders that he did not want to take a polygraph test offered to him by the police because "I've had a lot of dreams about killing her. I really don't know about taking that thing". The jury dismissed Shipp's claims after defense attorney Carl E. Douglas accused him of being an alcoholic who was testifying against Simpson because he wanted to promote his acting career. The prosecution then called Brown's sister to the witness stand. She tearfully testified to many episodes of domestic violence in the 1980s, when she saw Simpson pick up his wife and hurl her against a wall, then physically throw her out of their house during an argument. She also testified that Simpson was agitated with Brown the night of their daughter's dance recital as well, the same night Brown was murdered. Although a home videotape taken immediately after the dance recital showed a cheerful Simpson being given a kiss by Brown's sister, Kato Kaelin corroborated Brown's sister claim that Simpson was "upset" with Brown because of the black dress she wore, which he said was "tight".

The prosecution planned to present 62 separate incidents of domestic violence, including three previously unknown incidents Brown had documented in several letters she had written and placed in a bank safety deposit box. Judge Ito denied the defense's motion to suppress the incidents of domestic violence, but only allowed witnessed accounts to be presented to the jury because of Simpson's Sixth Amendment rights. The letters Brown had written and the statements she made to friends and family were ruled inadmissible as hearsay because Brown was dead and unable to be cross-examined. Despite this, the prosecution had witnesses for 44 separate incidents they planned to present to the jury.

However, the prosecution dropped the domestic violence portion of their case on June 20, 1995. Marcia Clark stated it was because they believed the DNA evidence against Simpson was insurmountable, but the media speculated it was because of the comments made by dismissed juror Jeanette Harris. Christopher Darden later confirmed that to be true. Harris was dismissed on April 6 because she failed to disclose that she was a victim of domestic violence from her ex-husband. But afterwards, Harris gave an interview and called the evidence of Simpson's abuse of Brown "a whole lot of nothing" and also said "that doesn't mean he is guilty of murder". This dismissal of Simpson's abusive behavior from a female juror, who was also a victim of such abuse by her own husband, convinced the prosecution that the jury was not receptive to the domestic violence argument. After the verdict, the jurors called the domestic violence portion of the case a "waste of time". Shapiro, Dershowitz, and Uelmen later admitted they believe that race played a factor in the jurors' dismissal of Brown's abuse by Simpson.

The defense retained renowned advocate for victims of domestic abuse, Dr. Lenore E. Walker. Cochran said that she would testify that Simpson does not fit the profile of an abuser that would murder his spouse. Walker's colleagues were appalled by her decision to defend Simpson and accused her of betraying her advocacy for a $250,000 retainer. Walker was dropped from the witness list for "tactical reasons" after she submitted her report on the case. In it, she opines that the statistic from Dershowitz that of the two million incidents of abuse per year, only 2,000 victims are actually murdered by their spouses as being misleading because Brown was already dead. The relevant statistic was "of the murdered spouses who were also victims of abuse, what percentage of them were murdered by their current or ex-husband?" When she reported that number was 80.3%, they dropped her from the witness list.

The revelation of Simpson's abuse of Brown is credited with turning public opinion against him. The public shock at the reason why Walker was dropped from the defense witness list is credited with transforming public opinion on spousal abuse from a private familial matter to a serious public health issue.

Timeline
Los Angeles County Chief Medical Examiner, Dr. Lakshmanan Sathyavagiswaran, testified on June 14, 1995, that Brown's time of death was estimated as between 10:00 pm and 10:30 pm. Kato Kaelin testified on March 22, 1995, that he last saw Simpson at 9:36 pm that evening. Simpson was not seen again until 10:54 pm when he answered the intercom at the front door for the limousine driver, Allan Park. Simpson had no alibi for approximately one hour and 18 minutes during which time the murders took place. Allan Park testified on March 28 that he arrived at Simpson's home at 10:25 pm on the night of the murders and stopped at the Rockingham entrance: Simpson's Bronco was not there. He then drove over to the Ashford entrance and rang the intercom three times, getting no answer, starting at 10:40pm. At approximately 10:50 pm he saw a "tall African American shadowy figure resembling Simpson" approach the front door before aborting towards the southern walkway that leads to Kaelin's bungalow.

Park's testimony was significant because it explained the location of the glove found at Simpson's home. The blood trail from the Bronco to the front door was easily understood but the glove was found on the other side of the house. Park said the "shadowy figure" initially approached the front door before heading down the southern walkway which leads to where the glove was found by Fuhrman. The prosecution believed that Simpson had driven his Bronco to and from Brown's home to commit the murders, saw that Park was there and aborted his attempt to enter through the front door and tried to enter through the back instead. He panicked and made the sounds that Kaelin heard when he realized that the security system would not let him enter through the rear entrance. He then discarded the glove, came back and went through the front door. During cross examination, Park conceded that he could not identify the figure but said he saw that person enter the front door and afterwards Simpson answered and said he was home alone. Park conceded that he did not notice any cuts on Simpson's left hand but added "I shook his right hand, not his left".

DNA evidence and blood trail

The prosecution presented a total of 108 exhibits, including 61 drops of blood, of DNA evidence allegedly linking Simpson to the murders. With no witnesses to the crime, the prosecution was dependent on DNA as the only physical evidence linking Simpson to the crime. The volume of DNA evidence in this case was unique and the prosecution believed they could reconstruct how the crime was committed with enough accuracy to resemble an eyewitness account. Marcia Clark stated in her opening statements that there was a "trail of blood from the Bundy Crime scene through Simpson's Ford Bronco to his bedroom at Rockingham".
 Simpson's DNA found on blood drops next to the bloody footprints near the victims at the Bundy crime scene. The prosecution stated that the probability of error was 1-in-9.7 billion.
 Simpson's DNA found on a trail of blood drops leading away from the victims, towards and on the back gate at Bundy. The prosecution stated that the probability of error was 1-in-200.
 Simpson, Goldman, and Brown's DNA found on blood on the outside of the door and inside Simpson's Bronco. The prosecution stated that the probability of error was 1-in-21 billion.
 Simpson's DNA found on blood drops leading from the area where his Bronco was parked at Simpson's Rockingham home to the front door entrance.
 Simpson, Brown and Goldman's DNA on a bloody glove found behind his home.
 Simpson and Brown's DNA found on blood on a pair of socks in Simpson's bedroom. The prosecution stated that the probability of error was 1-in-6.8 billion.

Hair and fiber evidence
LAPD criminalist and hair fiber expert Susan Brockbank testified on June 27, 1995, and FBI Special Agent and fiber expert Doug Deedrick testified on June 29, 1995, to the following findings:
 The fibers from the glove found at Simpson's home microscopically match the one found at the crime scene, proving they were each other's mate.
 Both of the victims, the two gloves, and the Blue knit cap worn by the killer had hair consistent with Simpson. The hair in the Blue Knit cap worn by the killer was embedded in the seams, indicating it was there from being worn repeatedly.
 Dark blue cotton clothing fibers were found on both victims. The video from the Dance recital that Simpson attended earlier that night shows him wearing a similarly colored shirt. Kato Kaelin testified that Simpson was still wearing that shirt when they got home from McDonald's but not anymore when he answered the door for the limousine driver. The police searched his home but the shirt was never found.
 Hair consistent with Goldman was found on Brown and clothing fibers consistent with Brown was found on Goldman. This supported the prosecution's theory that the assailant killed Brown first, then Goldman, and afterwards returned to Brown to cut her throat. The hair consistent with Brown that was found on the Rockingham glove was torn which also supports the prosecution claim that the killer grabbed Brown by her hair to cut her throat.
 Fibers that were only used in the 1993-1994 model year Ford Bronco, the same car that Simpson owns, were found on both victims, the knit cap and on both gloves.
 The glove found at Simpson's home that belonged to the murderer had hair and clothing fibers consistent with Simpson, Brown and Goldman as well as fibers from a 1993–1994 Ford Bronco and Brown's Akita dog.

Shoeprint analysis
On June 19, FBI shoeprint expert William J. Bodziak testified that the bloody shoeprints found at the crime scene and inside Simpson's Bronco were made from a rare and expensive pair of Bruno Magli Italian shoes. He determined the shoes were a size 12, the same size that Simpson wore, and are only sold at Bloomingdales. Only 29 pairs of that size were sold in the U.S. and one of them was sold at the same store that Simpson often buys his shoes from. Bodziak also testified that, despite two sets of footprints at the crime scene, only one attacker was present because they were all made by the same shoes. During cross-examination Bailey suggested the murderer deliberately wore shoes that were the wrong size, which Bodziak dismissed as "ridiculous".

Simpson denied ever owning a pair of those "ugly ass shoes" and there was only circumstantial evidence he did. Bloomingdales employee Samuel Poser testified he remembered showing Simpson those shoes but there was no store record of him purchasing them. Although the prosecution could not prove that Simpson owned a pair of those shoes, Bodziak testified that a similar bloody shoeprint was left on the floor inside Simpson's Bronco. Scheck suggested that Fuhrman broke into the Bronco and left the footprint there; he produced a photo of Fuhrman walking through a puddle of blood. Bodziak admitted that he was not able to confirm that the shoeprint in the car definitely came from a Bruno Magli shoe, but dismissed Scheck's claim because none of the shoeprints at the crime scene were made by Fuhrman's shoes, making it unlikely he could have made a bloody shoeprint in the Bronco.

Defense case

Simpson hired a team of high-profile defense lawyers, initially led by Robert Shapiro, who was previously a civil lawyer known for settling, and then subsequently by Johnnie Cochran, who at that point was known for police brutality and civil rights cases. The team included noted defense attorney F. Lee Bailey, Robert Kardashian, Harvard appeals lawyer Alan Dershowitz, his student Robert Blasier, and Dean of Santa Clara University School of Law Gerald Uelmen. Assisting Cochran were Carl E. Douglas and Shawn Holley. Barry Scheck and Peter Neufeld were also hired; they headed the Innocence Project and specialized in DNA evidence. Simpson's defense was said to have cost between US$3 million and $6 million; the media dubbed the group of talented attorneys the Dream Team, while the taxpayer cost of prosecution was over US$9 million.

Theory
The defense team's reasonable doubt theory was summarized as "compromised, contaminated, corrupted" in opening statements. They argued that the DNA evidence against Simpson was "compromised" by the mishandling of criminalists Dennis Fung and Andrea Mazzola during the collection phase of evidence gathering, and that 100% of the "real killer(s)" DNA had vanished from the evidence samples. The evidence was then "contaminated" in the LAPD crime lab by criminalist Collin Yamauchi, and Simpson's DNA from his reference vial was transferred to all but three exhibits. The remaining three exhibits were planted by the police and thus "corrupted" by police fraud. The defense also questioned the timeline, claiming the murders happened around 11:00 pm that night.

Timeline
Dr. Robert Huizenga testified on July 14, 1995 that Simpson was not physically capable of carrying out the murders due to chronic arthritis and old football injuries. During cross-examination, the prosecution produced an exercise video that Simpson made a few weeks before the murders titled O.J. Simpson Minimum Maintenance: Fitness for Men, which demonstrated that Simpson was anything but frail. Dr. Huizenga admitted afterwards that Simpson could have committed the murders if he was in "the throes of an adrenaline-rush".

Dr. Michael Baden, a forensic pathologist, testified that the murders happened closer to 11:00pm, which is when Simpson has an alibi and stated that Brown was still conscious, standing, and took a step after her throat was cut and that Goldman was standing and fighting his assailant for ten minutes with a lacerated jugular vein.

After the trial, Baden admitted his claim of Goldman's long struggle was inaccurate and that testifying for Simpson was a mistake. Critics claimed that Baden knowingly gave false testimony in order to collect a $100,000 retainer because the week before he testified, Dr. Gerdes admitted that Goldman's blood was in Simpson's Bronco despite Goldman never having an opportunity within his lifetime to be in the Bronco.

Compromised and contaminated
Barry Scheck and Peter Neufeld argued that the results from the DNA testing were not reliable because the police were "sloppy" in collecting and preserving it from the crime scene. Fung and Mazzola did admit to making several mistakes during evidence collection which included not always changing gloves between handling evidence items, packaging and storing the evidence items using plastic bags, rather than paper bags as recommended, and storing them in the police van, which was not refrigerated, for up to seven hours after collection. This, they argued, would allow bacteria to degrade all of the "real killer(s)" DNA and thus make the samples more susceptible to cross-contamination in the LAPD crime lab.

The prosecution denied that the mistakes made by Fung and Mazzola changed the validity of the results. They noted that all of the evidence samples were testable and that most of the DNA testing was done at the two consulting labs, not the LAPD crime lab where contamination supposedly happened. Since all of the samples the consulting labs received were testable, while Scheck and Neufeld's theory predicted that they should have been inconclusive after being "100% degraded", the claim that all the DNA was lost to bacterial degradation was not credible. The prosecution denied that contamination happened in the LAPD crime lab as well because the result would be a mixture of the "real killer(s)" DNA and Simpson's DNA but the results showed that only Simpson's DNA was present. The prosecution also noted the defense declined to challenge any of those results by testing the evidence themselves. Marcia Clark called Scheck and Neufeld's claims a "smoke-screen".

The contamination claim was made by microbiologist Dr. John Gerdes. He testified on August 2, 1995, that Forensic PCR DNA matching is not reliable and "The LAPD crime lab has a substantial contamination problem. It is chronic in the sense that it doesn't go away". Gerdes testified that because of the LAPD's history of contamination, he would not consider any of the PCR DNA matches in this case reliable because the tests were carried out by the LAPD. He also claimed that the consulting labs’ PCR DNA matches were not reliable, as the evidence they tested went "through the LAPD" for packaging and shipping. Gerdes believed only three of the DNA matches to have been valid, which were the same three the defense alleged were planted by the police.

During cross-examination, Dr. Gerdes admitted there was no evidence that cross-contamination had occurred and that he was only testifying to "what might occur and not what actually did occur". He accepted that the victims' blood was in the Bronco and Simpson's blood was at the crime scene and neither was due to contamination. He also conceded that nothing happened during "packaging and shipping" that would affect the validity of the results at the two consulting labs. The prosecution implied that Gerdes was not a credible witness: he had no forensic experience and had only testified for criminal defendants in the past and always said the DNA evidence against them was not reliable due to contamination. Clark also implied that it was not a coincidence that the three evidence items he initially said were valid were the same three the defense claimed were planted while the other 58 were all false positives and the 47 substrate controls, which are used to determine if contamination occurred, were all false negatives. Defense forensic DNA expert Dr. Henry Lee testified on August 24, 1995, and admitted that Gerdes's claim was "highly improbable".

Barry Scheck's eight-day cross-examination of Dennis Fung was lauded in the media. However, Howard Coleman, president of Seattle-based forensic DNA laboratory GeneLex, criticized Scheck's cross-examination as "smoke and mirrors" and stated "Everything we get in the lab is contaminated to some degree. What contamination and degradation will lead you to is an inconclusive result. It doesn't lead you to a false positive".

Police conspiracy allegation
The defense initially only claimed that three exhibits were planted by the police but eventually argued that virtually all of the blood evidence against Simpson was planted in a police conspiracy. They accused prison nurse Thano Peratis, criminalists Dennis Fung, Andrea Mazzola, and Colin Yamauchi, and Vannatter and Fuhrman, of participating in a plot to frame Simpson. In closing arguments, Cochran called Fuhrman and Vannatter "twins of deception" and told the jury to remember Vannatter as "the man who carried the blood" and Fuhrman as "the man who found the glove".

EDTA
The only physical evidence offered by the defense that the police tried to frame Simpson was the allegation that two of the 108 DNA evidence samples tested in the case contained the preservative Ethylenediaminetetraacetic acid, or EDTA. Ironically, it was the prosecution who asked to have the samples tested for the preservative, not the defense. The defense alleged that the drop of blood on the back gate at the Bundy crime scene, which matched Simpson, and the blood found on a pair of socks in Simpson's bedroom, which matched Brown, were planted by the police. In order to support the claim, the defense pointed to the presence of EDTA, a preservative found in the purple-topped collection tubes used for police reference vials, in the samples. On July 24, 1995, Dr. Fredric Rieders, a forensic toxicologist who had analysed results provided by FBI special agent Roger Martz, testified that the level of EDTA in the evidence samples was higher than that which is normally found in blood: this appeared to support the claim they came from the reference vials. During cross-examination, Clark asked Dr. Rieders to read out loud the portion of the EPA article that stated what the normal levels of EDTA in blood are, which he referenced during his testimony. This demonstrated that he misread it and that the levels found in the evidence samples were consistent with those found in blood that was not preserved in a police reference vial. Dr. Rieders then claimed it was a "typo" but the prosecution produced a direct copy from the EPA confirming the normal amounts of EDTA found in unpreserved blood. The prosecution also had Dr. Rieders admit that EDTA is also found in food and specifically the ingredients used in McDonald's Big Mac and French fries that Simpson had eaten earlier that night with Kato Kaelin.

FBI special agent Roger Martz was called by the defense on July 25, 1995, to testify that EDTA was present in the evidence samples, yet instead said he did not identify EDTA in the blood, contradicting the testimony given by Dr. Rieders the day before. Initially, he conceded the blood samples "responded like EDTA responded" and "was consistent with the presence of EDTA" but clarified his response after hearing during the lunch break that "everyone is saying that I found EDTA, but I am not saying that". When the defense accused their own witness of changing his demeanor to favor the prosecution, he replied "I cannot be entirely truthful by only giving 'yes' and 'no' answers". Martz stated that it was impossible to ascertain with certainty the presence of EDTA, as while the presumptive test for EDTA was positive, the identification test for EDTA was inconclusive. Martz also tested his own unpreserved blood and got the same results for EDTA levels as the evidence samples, which he said conclusively disproved the claim the evidence blood came from the reference vials. He contended that the defense had jumped to conclusions from the presumptive test results, while his tests had in fact shown that "those bloodstains did not come from preserved blood".

Back gate
The defense alleged that Simpson's blood on the back gate at the Bundy crime scene was planted by the police. The blood on the back gate was collected on July 3, 1995, rather than June 13, the day after the murders. The volume of DNA on that blood was significantly higher than the other blood evidence collected on June 13. The volume of DNA was so high that the defense conceded that it could not be explained by contamination in the lab, yet noted that it was unusual for that blood to have more DNA on it than the other samples collected at the crime scene, especially since it had been left exposed to the elements for several weeks and after the crime scene had supposedly been washed over. On March 20, 1995, Vannatter testified that he instructed Fung to collect the blood on the gate on June 13 and Fung admitted he had not done so. The defense suggested the reason why Fung did not collect the blood is because it was not there that day; Scheck showed a blown-up photograph taken of the back gate on June 13 and he admitted he could not see it in the photograph.

The prosecution responded by showing that a different photograph showed that the blood was present on the back gate on June 13 and before the blood had been taken from Simpson's arm. Officer Robert Riske was the first officer to the crime scene and the one who pointed out the blood on the back gate to Fuhrman, who documented it in his notes that night. Multiple other officers also testified under oath that the blood was present on the back gate the night of the murders. The prosecution also pointed out that the media cameras present proved that Vannatter never returned to the Bundy crime scene (Brown's home) that evening, where Simpson's blood was allegedly planted.

Bronco
Barry Scheck alleged the police had twice planted the victims' blood inside Simpson's Bronco. An initial collection was made on June 13; the defense accused Vannatter of planting the victims' blood in the Bronco when he returned to Simpson's home later that evening. The prosecution responded that the Bronco had already been impounded by the time Vannatter returned and was not even at Rockingham.

Socks
The defense alleged that the police had planted Brown's blood on the socks found in Simpson's bedroom. The socks were collected on June 13 and had blood from both Simpson and Brown, but her blood on the socks was not identified until August 4. The socks were found by Fuhrman, but the defense suggested Vannatter planted the blood. He had received both blood reference vials from the victims earlier that day from the coroner and booked them immediately into evidence. Vannatter then drove back to Rockingham later that evening to hand deliver the reference vial for Simpson to Fung, which the defense alleged gave him opportunity to plant the blood. Fung testified he could not see blood on the socks he collected from Simpson's bedroom but the prosecution later demonstrated that those blood stains are only visible underneath a microscope.

Vannatter denied planting Brown's blood on the socks. The video from Willie Ford indicated that the socks had already been collected and stored in the evidence van before Vannatter arrived and footage from the media cameras present appeared to prove that he never went inside the evidence van when he arrived at Rockingham.

Glove

The last exhibit allegedly planted was the bloody glove found at Simpson's property by Fuhrman. Unlike the sock and the back gate, the defense provided no physical or eyewitness evidence to support their claim that the prosecution could then refute. Jeffrey Toobin published an article in The New Yorker months before the trial began, which cited a source in Simpson's defense team that they intended to accuse Fuhrman of planting the glove with the motive being racism. Robert Shapiro later admitted he was Toobin's source.

Defense attorney F. Lee Bailey suggested that Fuhrman found the glove at the crime scene, picked it up with a stick and placed it in a plastic bag, and then concealed it in his sock when he drove to Simpson's home with Detectives Lange, Vannatter and Phillips. Bailey suggested that he then planted the glove in order to frame Simpson, with the motive either being racism or a desire to become the hero in a high-profile case. Scheck also suggested that Fuhrman broke into Simpson's Bronco and used the glove like a paint brush to plant blood onto and inside the Bronco.

The prosecution denied that Fuhrman planted the glove. They noted that several officers had already combed over the crime scene for almost two hours before Fuhrman arrived and none had noticed a second glove at the scene. Lange testified that 14 other officers were there when Fuhrman arrived and all said there was only one glove at the crime scene. Lt. Frank Spangler also testified that he was with Fuhrman for the duration of his time there and stated he would have seen Fuhrman purloin the glove if he had in fact done so. Clark added that Fuhrman did not know whether Simpson had an alibi, if there were any witnesses to the murders, whose blood was on the glove, that the Bronco belonged to Simpson, or whether Kaelin had already searched the area where the glove was found.

During cross-examination by Bailey, Fuhrman denied that he had used the word "nigger" to describe African Americans in the ten years prior to his testimony. A few months later, the defense discovered audiotapes of Fuhrman repeatedly using the word – 41 times in total, eight years before the murders. The Fuhrman tapes became the cornerstone of the defense's case that Fuhrman's testimony lacked credibility. Clark called the tapes "the biggest red herring there ever was".

After McKinny was forced to hand over the tapes to the defense, Fuhrman says he asked the prosecution for a redirect to explain the context of those tapes but the prosecution and his fellow police officers abandoned him after Ito played the audiotapes in open court for the public to hear. The public reaction to the tapes was explosive and compared to the video of the Rodney King beating from a year prior. After the trial, Fuhrman said that he was not a racist and apologized for his previous language, saying he was play-acting for a screenplay when he made the tapes, and had been asked to be as dramatic as possible. Many of his minority former coworkers expressed support for him.

On September 6, 1995, Fuhrman was called back to the witness stand by the defense, after the prosecution refused to redirect him, to answer more questions. The jury was absent but the exchange was televised. Fuhrman, facing a possible prosecution for perjury, was instructed by his attorney to invoke the Fifth Amendment to avoid self-incrimination to two consecutive questions he was asked. Defense attorney Uelmen asked Fuhrman if it was his intention to plead the Fifth to all questions, and Fuhrman's attorney instructed him to reply "yes". Uelmen then briefly spoke with the other members of the defense and said he had just one more question: "Did you plant or manufacture any evidence in this case?" Following his attorney's instruction, Fuhrman replied, "I choose to assert my Fifth Amendment privilege".

Cochran responded to Fuhrman's pleading the Fifth by accusing the other officers of being involved in a "cover-up" to protect Fuhrman and asked Judge Ito to suppress all of the evidence that Fuhrman found. Ito denied the request, stating that pleading the fifth does not imply guilt and there was no evidence of fraud. Cochran then asked that the jury be allowed to hear Fuhrman taking the fifth and again Ito denied his request. Ito also criticized the defense's theory of how Fuhrman allegedly planted the glove stating "it would strain logic to believe that".

On June 15, 1995, Christopher Darden surprised Marcia Clark by asking Simpson to try on the gloves found at the crime scene and his home. The prosecution had earlier decided against asking Simpson to try them on because they had been soaked in blood from Simpson, Brown and Goldman, and frozen and unfrozen several times. Instead they presented a witness who testified that Brown had purchased a pair of those gloves in the same size in 1990 at Bloomingdales for Simpson along with a receipt and a photo during the trial of Simpson earlier wearing the same type of gloves.

The leather gloves appeared too tight for Simpson to put on easily, especially over the latex gloves he wore underneath. Clark claimed that Simpson was acting when he appeared to be struggling to put on the gloves, yet Cochran replied "I don't think he could act the size of his hands". Darden then told Ito of his concerns that Simpson "has arthritis and we looked at the medication he takes and some of it is anti-inflammatory and we are told he has not taken the stuff for a day and it caused swelling in the joints and inflammation in his hands". Cochran informed Ito the next day that Shawn Chapman contacted the Los Angeles County Jail doctor, who confirmed Simpson was taking his arthritis medication every day and that the jail's medical records verified this. Uelmen came up with, and Cochran repeated, a quip he used in his closing arguments: "If it doesn't fit, you must acquit".

The prosecution stated they believed the gloves shrank from having been soaked in the blood of the victims. Richard Rubin, former vice president of glove maker Aris Isotoner Inc. which makes the gloves in question, testified on September 12, 1995, that the gloves had indeed shrunk from their original size. Darden produced a new pair of the same type of gloves, which fit Simpson when he tried them on.

After the trial, Cochran revealed that Bailey had goaded Darden into asking Simpson to try on the gloves and that Shapiro had told Simpson in advance how to give the appearance that they did not fit.

Summation

In closing arguments, Darden ridiculed the notion that police officers might have wanted to frame Simpson. He questioned why, if the LAPD was against Simpson, they went to his house eight times on domestic violence calls against Brown between 1986 and 1988 but did not arrest him; they only arrested him on charges of abuse in January 1989, when photos of Brown's face were entered into the record. Darden noted the police did not arrest Simpson for five days after the 1994 murders. During the prosecution's closing argument, Cochran and Scheck very notably objected seventy-one times in order to lessen its effect on the jury, and though Ito overruled sixty-nine of them, he did not once admonish Cochran or Scheck or threaten them with contempt of court for their behavior.

In Cochran's summation to the jury, he was unable to refute any of the prosecution's claims, so he instead dedicated his entire argument to attacking the LAPD, particularly Fuhrman, Lange and Vannatter. He emphasized that Fuhrman was proved to have repeatedly referred to black people as "niggers" and also to have boasted of beating young black men in his role as a police officer. Cochran compared Fuhrman to Adolf Hitler and referred to him as "a genocidal racist, a perjurer, America's worst nightmare and the personification of evil", and claimed without proof that Fuhrman had planted the glove in an attempt to frame Simpson for the murders based purely on his dislike of interracial couples. Cochran also presented a piece of paper to the jury with the title "Vannatter's Big Lies", and claimed, without any evidence or proof, that Vannatter had returned to the crime scene with Simpson's blood to plant it there, despite Vannatter having previously testified that he had given it to Dennis Fung in order to avoid the exhibits from getting mixed up. Cochran referred to Fuhrman and Vannatter as the "two devils of deception", and very notably implored the jurors to "stop this cover-up" and "acquit Simpson and send the police a message", which was interpreted by many as a naked appeal for a jury nullification. Following his summation, Cochran received numerous death threats, and hired bodyguards from Louis Farrakhan. In response, Fred Goldman, who was himself Jewish, referred to Cochran himself as "the worst kind of racist ever" and a "sick man" for comparing Fuhrman to Hitler while associating himself with Farrakhan, who was widely considered a black supremacist and anti-Semite, while Robert Shapiro, also Jewish, expressed that he was particularly offended by Cochran comparing Fuhrman's claims to the Holocaust, claiming that no comparison would ever be possible. In an interview regarding Vincent Bugliosi's analysis on the case, Vannatter claimed that he was so infuriated at Cochran's claims about him that he felt a desire to strangle him in the courtroom.

Verdict
Fears grew that race riots, similar to the riots in 1992, would erupt across Los Angeles and the rest of the country if Simpson were convicted of the murders. As a result, all Los Angeles police officers were put on 12-hour shifts. The police arranged for more than 100 police officers on horseback to surround the Los Angeles County courthouse on the day the verdict was announced, in case of rioting by the crowd. President Bill Clinton was briefed on security measures if rioting were to occur nationwide.

The only testimony that the jury reviewed was that of limo driver Park. At 10:07 am on Tuesday, October 3, 1995, Simpson was acquitted on both counts of murder. The jury arrived at the verdict by 3:00 pm on October 2, after four hours of deliberation, but it postponed the announcement. After the verdict was read, juror number nine, 44-year-old Lionel Cryer, gave Simpson a black power raised fist salute. The New York Times reported that Cryer was a former member of the revolutionary nationalist Black Panther Party that prosecutors had "inexplicably left on the panel".

An estimated 100 million people worldwide watched or listened to the verdict's announcement. Long-distance telephone call volume declined by 58%, and trading volume on the New York Stock Exchange decreased by 41%. Water usage decreased as people avoided using bathrooms. So much work stopped that the verdict cost an estimated $480 million in lost productivity. The U.S. Supreme Court received a message on the verdict during oral arguments, with the justices quietly passing the note to each other while listening to the attorney's presentation. Congressmen canceled press conferences, with Joe Lieberman telling reporters, "Not only would you not be here, but I wouldn't be here, either".

Acquittal and aftermath

African American LAPD Police Chief Willie Williams indicated that he had no plans to reopen the investigation, saying of the acquittals, "It doesn't mean there's another murderer". The LAPD also declined to reexamine the evidence with modern methods because Simpson can not be tried for the same crime again under the Fifth Amendment.

Legislative changes

The strong public reaction to Brown's letters and statements describing her abuse spurred passage of the Violence Against Women Act in 1994, which Clark and Douglas referred to as the "O.J. rule". After the trial, researchers reported increased reporting, arrests, and harsher sentences for those convicted of domestic violence.

Analysis of polling data
After the verdict, polling showed that 75% of White Americans thought Simpson was guilty while 70% of African Americans thought he was innocent. An NBC poll taken 10 years later in 2004 reported similar results with 87% of whites believing Simpson was guilty compared to only 27% of African Americans believing so. In 2016, 20 years after the verdict, polling showed the gap had narrowed with a majority of both now believing he was guilty: 83% of white Americans and 57% of black Americans.

Political impact and civil rights

Scholarly consensus is that the trial damaged race relations in America and point to polling which shows that belief in Simpson's guilt depended on the race of the individual and not on the evidence against him. Analysis of the "racial gap" in polling shows that it did not cross the political spectrum. Conservatives regardless of race or gender thought Simpson was guilty. Where the gap emerged was among liberals – with black liberals believing Simpson was innocent while white liberals thought he was guilty. African American Stanford University Law Professor Richard Thompson Ford wrote that this made the verdict a wedge issue that divided liberals along racial lines as white liberals felt the verdict was a racially motivated jury nullification and resented the images of African Americans celebrating the verdict. Opponents of civil rights seized upon the situation and rebranded themselves as advocating "race neutrality", instead of "separate but equal", which appealed to white liberals now due to the verdict and is credited with why voters in California passed proposition 209 in 1996 that ended affirmative action in the state. A historic drop in diversity in the University of California followed which led to a similar lack of diversity seen in the state's White-collar job market, particularly the High tech area of Silicon Valley. Opponents then tried to pass Proposition 54 to effectively conceal the impact of prop 209 but voters rejected that measure. The murder of George Floyd revived empathy for racial injustice among white liberals but the unsuccessful attempt to repeal prop 209 in 2020 is credited to the trial's legacy of undermining race relations.

Polling shows that minorities were divided by the verdict as well. Latinos and African Americans both believed that fraud was taking place in the LAPD but disagreed on the cause. Simpson said he felt vindicated by the Rampart Scandal which proved that fraud was happening in the C.R.A.S.H anti-gang unit. However, this fraud was not racially motivated: all the officers involved were minorities themselves and were actually found to be affiliated with one of the gangs they were supposed to be policing.

Publications
Several jurors together published Madame Foreman in 1995 to respond to allegations the verdict was racially motivated. They concluded that Simpson probably was guilty but the prosecution failed to prove it beyond a reasonable doubt.

Johnnie Cochran published Journey to Justice in 1996 about the trial and denied he played the "race card" and maintains the LAPD tried to frame Simpson.

Robert Shapiro published The Search for Justice in 1996 about the case and he concluded there was reasonable doubt but criticized Bailey and Cochran for bringing race into the trial. In contrast to Cochran's book, Shapiro wrote "I never believed that Simpson was being victimized by a racist police organization because he was black…or that he was seen as a black hero".

Marcia Clark published Without a Doubt in 1998 about the case. She opines that the acquittal demonstrates the legal system is still compromised by race and celebrity because the prosecution's physical evidence should have easily convicted Simpson.

Christopher Darden published In Contempt in 1998 about the trial. He attributes the acquittal to poor stewardship by a "starstruck" Judge Ito and a "dysfunctional and uneducated" jury.

Vincent Bugliosi published Outrage: The five Reasons why O. J. Simpson got away with Murder in 1997. Bugliosi believed Simpson was guilty and blames the verdict on an incompetent jury, prosecution, and Judge. He wrote that "Other than when a killer is apprehended in the act, I have never seen a more obvious case of guilt. All of the evidence – not some or most of it – points irresistibly to Simpson's guilt and his guilt alone".

Henry Lee published Blood Evidence: How DNA Is Revolutionizing The Way We Solve Crimes in 2003 and wrote that both of the defense's forensic DNA experts, Lee and Edward Blake, had rejected Scheck's contamination claim.

Mark Fuhrman published Murder in Brentwood in 1998, defending himself against fraud claims. He wrote his taking the 5th amendment was to avoid prosecution for perjury.

Tom Lange and Philip Vannatter published Evidence Dismissed: The Inside Story of the Police Investigation of O.J. Simpson in 1997 and defended themselves against allegations of corruption and incompetence.

Daniel M. Petrocelli published Triumph of Justice: The final judgement of the Simpson Saga in 1998 and compares the criminal and civil trials. He attributes the acquittal to bad rulings by Judge Ito, unethical behavior by the defense and unreliable testimony from Gerdes, Rieders, Lee, and Baden.

Darnell Hunt published O.J. Simpson Facts and Fictions: News Rituals in the Construction of Reality And wrote that the racial gap in polling is a manufactured product of selective reporting of facts by the media due to them treating the trial as a form of entertainment and not as a legal proceeding.

If I Did It

In November 2006, ReganBooks announced a book ghostwritten by Pablo Fenjves based on interviews with Simpson titled If I Did It, an account which the publisher said was a hypothetical confession. The book's release was planned to coincide with a Fox special featuring Simpson. On November 20, News Corporation canceled the project due to public criticism. Later, the Goldman family was awarded the rights to the book and published it under the title If I Did It: Confessions of the Killer. On March 11, 2018, Fox broadcast Simpson's previously unaired interview in a special titled O.J. Simpson: The Lost Confession?. The interview was interpreted as being a form of implied confession because Simpson used first person language ("Obviously I must have [removed the glove]") in explaining how he committed the murders.

Post-trial interviews
In an interview with Barbara Walters, Robert Shapiro, who is Jewish, said he was offended by Cochran comparing Fuhrman to Adolf Hitler, and said he would never work with Bailey or Cochran again. He also admitted the defense played the "race card", "from the bottom of the deck". Robert Kardashian admitted that, prior to the jurors visiting Simpson's home, the defense team had switched out his photos of white women for photos of his children and switched out a picture of a nude Paula Barbieri (Simpson's girlfriend at the time, who was white) for a Norman Rockwell painting from Cochran's office.

Simpson gave two high-profile interviews regarding the case – in 1996 with Ross Becker and in 2004 with Katie Couric. In the February 1998 issue of Esquire, Simpson was quoted as saying, "Let's say I committed this crime ...even if I did this, it would have to have been because I loved her very much, right?". In April 1998, Simpson did an interview with Ruby Wax and pretended to stab her using a banana in an apparent joke referencing the stabbing death of his wife. In May 2008, Mike Gilbert released his book How I Helped O.J. Get Away with Murder, which quotes Simpson allegedly saying: "If she hadn't opened that door with a knife in her hand ... she'd still be alive."

In the documentary O.J.: Made in America, juror Carrie Bess said she believed "90% of the jury actually decided to acquit Simpson as payback for Rodney King". Juror Lionel Cryer, who gave Simpson a Black Power salute after the verdict, said in retrospect he would render a guilty verdict. Juror Anise Aschenbach, who initially voted guilty before changing her vote, stated she regrets the decision and believes Simpson is guilty because he is not looking for the "real killer" like he promised he would.

Civil trial
In 1996, Fred Goldman and Sharon Rufo, the parents of Ron Goldman, and Lou Brown, father of Nicole Brown filed a civil suit against Simpson for wrongful death. The plaintiffs were represented by Daniel Petrocelli and Simpson by Robert Baker. Presiding Judge Hiroshi Fujisaki did not allow the trial to be televised, did not sequester the jury, and prohibited the defense from alleging racism by the LAPD and from condemning the crime lab. The physical evidence did not change but additional evidence of domestic violence was presented as well as 31 pre-1994 photos of Simpson wearing Bruno Magli shoes, including one that was published 6 months before the murders, proving it could not be a forgery. Results from a polygraph test that Simpson denied taking showed "extreme deception" when he denied committing the murders. Fuhrman did not testify but Simpson did on his own behalf and lied several times.

The jury found Simpson liable for the murders and awarded the victims' families $33.5 million in compensatory and punitive damages. Simpson filed for bankruptcy afterwards and relocated to Florida to protect his pension from seizure. His remaining assets were seized and auctioned off with most being purchased by critics of the verdict of the criminal trial to help the plaintiffs recoup the costs of litigation. Simpson's Heisman Trophy was sold for $255,500 to an undisclosed buyer. All the proceeds went to the Goldman family who said they have received only 1% of the money that Simpson owes from the wrongful death suit.

 Alternate theories and suspects 
According to O.J.: Made in America director Ezra Edelman, no plausible alternative theory has emerged since the trial. Such theories have been rejected by the trial's participants, with Hunt opining that these claims were attempts to tap into the public interest in the case and were never meant to be taken seriously.

William Dear published O.J. Is Innocent and I Can Prove It, which was adapted into the BBC documentary O.J.: The True Untold Story (2000). The documentary primarily rehashes the contamination and blood planting claims from the trial and asserted that Simpson's elder son Jason is a possible suspect.

Alternative theories of the murders have suggested they were related to the Los Angeles drug trade and the murders of Michael Nigg and Brett Cantor.

In 2012, the documentary film My Brother the Serial Killer alleged convicted murderer Glen Edward Rogers confessed to being involved in the murders and claimed he had been hired by Simpson to do it. The families of Brown and Goldman dismissed its claims and accused Henry Schlieff of Investigation Discovery of irresponsibility. He replied that he believed Simpson was guilty and the documentary's intention was not to prove Rogers committed the crimes.

In popular culture
Media adaptations
 In 1995, Fox premiered the television movie The O. J. Simpson Story, which followed some of the more tawdry events in the relationship between Simpson and Brown, up to and including his arrest for Brown's murder. Simpson is portrayed by Bobby Hosea.
 In 2000, 20th Century Fox produced American Tragedy, starring Ving Rhames as Cochran, Christopher Plummer as Bailey, Ron Silver as Shapiro, and Raymond Forchion as Simpson.
 BBC TV's documentary, O.J. Simpson: The Untold Story (2000), produced by Malcolm Brinkworth, "reveals that clues that some believe pointed away from Simpson as the killer were dismissed or ignored and highlights two other leads which could shed new light on the case".
 In 2014, ID premiered the documentary OJ: Trial of the Century, which begins on the day of the murders, ends on the reading of the verdict, and comprises actual media footage of events and reactions as they unfolded.
 In February 2016, FX premiered the anthology series American Crime Story. The self-contained first season, The People v. O.J. Simpson: American Crime Story, was adapted from the book The Run of His Life: The People v. O.J. Simpson (1997), by Jeffrey Toobin, who had also served as a legal analyst for the New Yorker on the trial. The cast included Sarah Paulson as Clark, Courtney B. Vance as Cochran, John Travolta as Shapiro, David Schwimmer as Kardashian, Sterling K. Brown as Darden, and Cuba Gooding Jr. as Simpson. It received critical acclaim and several Emmy Awards.
 In April 2014, ID premiered O.J. Simpson Trial: The Real Story, which entirely comprises archival news footage of the murder case, the Bronco chase, the trial, the verdict, and reactions.
 In June 2016, ESPN premiered O.J.: Made in America, a five-part, eight-hour documentary by Ezra Edelman on the trial. The documentary received widespread acclaim and won the Academy Award for Best Documentary Feature.
 In January 2020, Court TV premiered OJ25, a 25-part series documenting each week of the trial and hosted by former Los Angeles prosecutor and legal analyst Roger Cossack.

Film
The 1997 film Lost Highway, directed and co-written by David Lynch, was partially inspired by the case. In the film a man is imprisoned for his wife's murder, which he does not remember, and is released after he transforms into different man. Lynch found it remarkable that Simpson, who he believed committed the murders, could continue a casual lifestyle afterward.

TV
Episodes of sitcoms, such as The Simpsons, South Park, Roseanne, New Girl, Family Guy, It's Always Sunny in Philadelphia ("Reynolds vs. Reynolds: The Cereal Defense") and Seinfeld ("The Big Salad", "The Caddy"), have mocked the case, or more specifically, Simpson himself.Saturday Night Live Weekend Update host Norm Macdonald frequently made jokes about O.J. Simpson's trial, such as the iconic line "Well, it is finally official: Murder is legal in the state of California" after Simpson's acquittal. It is rumored that the constant Simpson jokes were the cause for then NBC President Don Ohlmeyer to remove him from the Weekend Update segment, and eventually from the show altogether.

Cowlings' white Ford Bronco was featured in the reality TV show Pawn Stars. The then-owner of the vehicle estimated its value in excess of $1,000,000.

Music
The heavy-metal band Body Count recorded the song "I Used to Love Her", sung from the perspective of OJ Simpson murdering his wife, on their 1997 album Violent Demise: The Last Days. A 2021 article in Metal Hammer described the song as "jaw-droppingly offensive".

R&B group H-Town dedicated their album Ladies Edition, Woman's World (1997) to Brown, to help victims of domestic violence.

Rapper Jay-Z's song "The Story of O.J." references the trial.

Hip hop artist Magneto Dayo released a 2013 "diss track" song titled "OJ Simpson" in which he insults his ex-girlfriend/artist V-Nasty, by referencing the Simpson murder case. The song's lyrics were also added to the Houston Press list of "The 15 Most Messed-Up O.J. Simpson Lyrics"."OJ Simpson". L.A. Weekly.

Electronic musician James Ferraro referenced the police chase in the song "White Bronco" on his 2015 album Skid Row.

Kendrick Lamar included OJ in the music video for "The Heart Part 5", using Deepfake technology. The infamous glove also appears on the single's cover.

Video games
The video game Duke Nukem 3D'' has several allusions to the Simpson trial, including a television playing the Bronco chase.

Exhibits
The suit Simpson wore when he was acquitted on October 3, 1995, was donated by Simpson's former agent Mike Gilbert to the Newseum in 2010. The Newseum has multiple trial-related items in their collection, including press passes, newspapers and the mute button that Superior Court Judge Lance Ito used when he wanted to shut off the live microphone in court so lawyers could talk privately during the trial. The museum's acquisition of the suit ended the legal battle between Gilbert and Fred Goldman, both of whom claimed the right to the clothing.

Cowlings's white Ford bronco that he drove in the police chase is on display at the Alcatraz East Crime Museum in Pigeon Forge, Tennessee.

In 2017, Adam Papagan curated a pop-up museum showcasing artifacts and ephemera from the trial at Coagula Curatorial gallery in Los Angeles.

See also

 Chewbacca defense
 Fuhrman tapes
 National Football League controversies
 National Football League player conduct policy
 O. J. Simpson robbery case
 Trial of Yolanda Saldívar – the "Hispanic O.J. Simpson trial"
 List of homicides in California

References

Bibliography

Further reading

External links
 Famous American Trials: The O.J. Simpson Trial
 5 year retrospective
 O.J. Simpson verdict ten years later (PBS Frontline streaming video)
 The trial transcripts, CNN
 OJ Simpson Criminal Trial Uncut Start-to-Finish (1995) CONUS Archive.
 
 

 
1994 controversies in the United States
1990s trials
1994 in Los Angeles
1994 in American television
1994 murders in the United States
1995 controversies in the United States
1995 in Los Angeles
1995 in American television
20th-century American trials
Criminal investigation
Criminal trials that ended in acquittal
Domestic violence in the United States
History of Los Angeles
Intimate partner violence
Legal history of California
Murder in Los Angeles
National Football League controversies
Photojournalism controversies
Unsolved murders in the United States
Violence against women in the United States